Compsomantis robusta is a species of praying mantis found in Borneo.

References

Compsomantis
Endemic fauna of Borneo
Insects described in 1923